Luise Pauline Maria Biron, Princess of Courland, Duchess of Sagan (19 February 1782 – 8 January 1845) was the Duchess Regnant of Sagan between 1838 and 1845.  She was Princess consort of Hohenzollern-Hechingen by marriage to Friedrich Hermann Otto, Prince of Hohenzollern-Hechingen.

Life
Pauline was the second-eldest child and daughter of Peter von Biron, the last Duke of Courland and Semigallia, and his third wife Dorothea von Medem.

Pauline married Friedrich Hermann Otto, Hereditary Prince of Hohenzollern-Hechingen, on 26 February 1800 in Prague. She separated from her spouse in 1805, after an affair with her brother-in-law Prince Louis de Rohan-Guémenée (1768–1836). 

During the Vienna Congress of 1815, she had an affair with General Ludwig von Wallmoden-Gimborn which attracted attention. 

In 1838, she inherited the Duchy of Sagan after the death of her sister. She appointed her son as her heir. She herself preferred to live in Vienna. After her death, she was succeeded as Duchess by her sister.

Issue
Pauline and Friedrich had one son:

 Constantine, Prince of Hohenzollern-Hechingen (16 February 1801 – 3 September 1869)

References

1782 births
1845 deaths
Princesses of Hohenzollern-Hechingen
House of Hohenzollern-Hechingen
House of Biron
People from Jelgava
Dukes of Żagań
People from the Duchy of Courland and Semigallia
19th-century women rulers